Paul Noden West (23 February 1930 – 18 October 2015) was a British-born American novelist, poet, and essayist. He was born in Eckington, Derbyshire in England to Alfred and Mildred (Noden) West. Before his death, he resided in Ithaca, New York, with his wife Diane Ackerman, a writer, poet, and naturalist. West is the author of more than 50 books.

Early life

West grew up in Eckington, a rural mining town in Derbyshire, England. His father, partly blinded in World War I, was often unemployed. His mother, a talented pianist, gave private lessons to help support the family. She encouraged West in his love of words and his literary ambitions. In a 1989 interview by author and literary critic David W. Madden, West said he was also encouraged by three teachers, "amazing women who taught English, French, and Latin and Greek" at an otherwise "mediocre grammar school". They were, he said, "...marvelous to me. They encouraged me because they felt I had some gift for languages and should pursue that, and they groomed me."

After graduating with honors in English from the University of Birmingham, West studied at Lincoln College, Oxford, and then as a Smith-Mundt scholar at Columbia University in the United States from 1952 to 1953, from which he graduated with a master's degree. His early life also included a stint in the Royal Air Force from 1954 to 1957, during which he achieved the rank of flight lieutenant. From 1957 he taught English literature at Memorial University of Newfoundland until, in 1962, he began teaching at Pennsylvania State University. It was there in the early 1970s that he met Diane Ackerman, who became his wife.

Awards
Among other honors, West's literary awards have included the American Academy of Arts and Letters award for literature (1985), the Lannan Prize for fiction (1993), and the Grand-Prix Halpèrine-Kaminsky Prize (1993) for best foreign book. West was named a "literary lion" by the New York Public Library and a Chevalier of the Order of Arts and Letters (Ordre des Arts et Lettres) by the French government.

Analysis

West's work is highly varied in form and content. According to reviewer Lore Segal, "He has published poetry, criticism, essays, memoirs (including an extended, sometimes hilarious meditation on learning to swim in middle age) and...novels of an unsettling nonuniformity." Among the many writers who influenced West's work, writes literary critic David Madden, were Jean-Paul Sartre (direct prose, existentialism, alienation, self-definition); Shakespeare (language); Thomas De Quincey (involutes; that is "compound experiences incapable of being disentangled"); Samuel Beckett (word play, nonconforming fiction); and T. S. Eliot (the objective correlative, which West called "an emotional shorthand; a morse for the soul").

According to Madden, West placed high importance on the role of the imagination, as distinguished from convention or dogma, in the creation of fiction and non-fiction. He favored intense flamboyant prose over minimalist writing, which he regarded as generally vapid. His interest in the mutability of what is conventionally thought to be real led to an interest in Latin American fiction and its "penchant for the magical and improbable". Likewise, it led him to scientific studies of "the overwhelming abundance of the universe" from atoms to stars, a friendship with astronomer Carl Sagan, and the writing of The Universe, and Other Fictions and other work expressing amazement at existence.

West told Madden that music was his favorite art and that he usually listened to music while writing. For the writing itself, he used an electric typewriter, which for him had a musical link: "Sometimes I think I am playing the piano, which I cannot do, but I hear rhythms in my tapping and sometimes, Glenn Gould-like, I chant as I go to remind myself what's coming in the next few lines."

West and his novel The Very Rich Hours of Count von Stauffenberg figure prominently in a chapter in Nobel Laureate J. M. Coetzee's book Elizabeth Costello. Coetzee's title character is disturbed by the horrors West describes in his book, which includes vivid descriptions of the deaths, by torture and hanging, of the Germans who tried to assassinate Hitler. In a lecture, "Witness, Silence and Censorship", given in Amsterdam at a conference on evil, she plans to question whether authors should think or write about such things. West (Coetzee's fictitious character), unbeknown to Costello until only hours before her pointed lecture, is also attending the conference. When she seeks him out to warn him that she is using his novel an example of something that should not be written, he listens but says nothing. Author and critic David Lodge, in his review of Elizabeth Costello, says, "For a writer to introduce another, living writer as a character into his fiction, especially in such a prejudicial light, is a very unusual, perhaps unprecedented, thing to do."

Personal life

West retired from teaching in 1995. In 2003, he had a stroke, his second, which his wife, Diane Ackerman, has written about in her book One Hundred Names for Love: A Stroke, a Marriage and the Language of Healing. He died on 18 October 2015 at the age of 85 in Ithaca, New York, from pneumonia. He is survived by his sister, Sheila Forster, and perhaps by a daughter, Amanda, about whom he wrote but with whom he later lost touch.

Works

Long fiction

 A Quality of Mercy, 1961
 Tenement of Clay, 1965
 Alley Jaggers, 1966
 I'm Expecting to Live Quite Soon, 1970
 Caliban's Filibuster, 1971
 Bela Lugosi's White Christmas, 1972
 Colonel Mint, 1972
 Gala, 1976
 The Very Rich Hours of Count von Stauffenberg, 1980
 Rat Man of Paris, 1986
 The Place in Flowers Where Pollen Rests, 1988
 Lord Byron's Doctor, 1989
 The Women of Whitechapel and Jack the Ripper, 1991
 Love's Mansion, 1992
 The Tent of Orange Mist, 1995
 Sporting with Amaryllis, 1996
 Life With Swan, 1997
 Terrestrials, 1997
 OK: The Corral, the Earps and Doc Holliday, 2000
 The Dry Danube: A Hitler Forgery, 2000
 A Fifth of November, 2001
 Cheops: A Cupboard for the Sun, 2002
 The Immensity of the Here and Now: A Novel of 9.11, 2003

Short fiction
The Universe and Other Fictions, 1988

Poetry
 Poems, 1952
 The Spellbound Horses, 1960
 The Snow Leopard, 1964
 Alphabet Poetry
 Tea with Osiris, 2006

Non-fiction

Books
 The Growth of the Novel: Eight Radio Talks as Heard on CBC University of the Air, 1959
 Byron and the Spoiler's Art, 1960 – 2nd ed. 1992
 I, Said the Sparrow, 1963
 The Modern Novel, 1963
 Robert Penn Warren, 1964
 The Wine of Absurdity:  Essays in Literature and Consolation, 1966
 Words for a Deaf Daughter, 1969
 Out of My Depths:  A Swimmer in the Universe, 1983
 Sheer Fiction, 1987
 Portable People, 1990
 Sheer Fiction, vol. 2, 1991
 Sheer Fiction, vol. 3, 1994
 James Ensor, 1991
 My Mother's Music, 1996
 A Stroke of Genius:  Illness and Self-Discovery, 1995
 The Secret Lives of Words, 2000
 Master Class, Scenes From A Fiction Workshop, 2001
 Oxford Days, 2002
 Sheer Fiction, vol. 4, 2004
 My Father's War, 2005
 The Shadow Factory, 2008

Articles

Edited text
Byron: A Collection of Critical Essays (Twentieth Century Views series), 1963

References

Works cited

Further reading
 Cyclopedia of World Authors, 3rd Ed. Vol. 5, Sim-Z. "Paul West". pp 2137–2138.

External links

"Word Patriots—Paul West Early Years" November 2011 radio program/podcast discussing West's early work; hosted by Mark Seinfelt.
'Mem, Mem, Mem' After a stroke, West struggles to say how the mental world of aphasia looks and feels. According to his wife Diane Ackerman: "this is an excerpt from The Shadow Factory, the aphasic memoir West dictated with such struggle and resolve, 'forcing language back on itself.' "
"The Paul West Experience – Liberating the Microcosms" An homage from former student Edward Desautels, delivered at the 4th Biennial &Now Festival of Innovative Writing & the Literary Arts, 2009, Buffalo, NY as part of the panel "Purple Mind: A Paul West Panel."

1930 births
2015 deaths
People from Eckington, Derbyshire
20th-century British novelists
21st-century British novelists
Royal Air Force officers
British male novelists
British male poets
British poets
20th-century British male writers
21st-century British male writers
Deaths from pneumonia in New York (state)